Kwieciński (feminine: Kwiecińska, plural: Kwiecińscy) is a Polish surname. It may refer to:

 Andrzej Kwieciński (born 1984), Polish composer
 Czesław Kwieciński (born 1943), Polish wrestler
 Grant Kwiecinski (born 1990), American musician
 Ireneusz Kwieciński (born 1974), Polish judoka
 Rafał Kwieciński (born 1975), Polish footballer
 Włodzimierz Kwieciński (born 1955), Polish karateka

See also
 
Mikhail Kvetsinsky also known as Michael (von) Kwetzinsky (1866–1923), Russian officer and a military administrator

Polish-language surnames